Rasmus Lind (born 8 April 1983) is a Danish handball player, who plays for SG Flensburg-Handewitt.

References

1983 births
Living people
Danish male handball players
People from Struer Municipality
SG Flensburg-Handewitt players
Sportspeople from the Central Denmark Region